Edmonton-North West is a provincial electoral district in Alberta, Canada that has existed twice, first as Edmonton North West between 1959 and 1971, and for a second time since 2019. The district is one of 87 districts mandated to return a single member (MLA) to the Legislative Assembly of Alberta using the first past the post method of voting. It will be contested next in the 2023 Alberta election.

Geography
The district is located in northwest Edmonton, containing the neighbourhoods of Lauderdale, Rosslyn, Kensington, Griesbach, Carlisle, Caernarvon, Baranow, Hudson, Cumberland, Oxford, Carlton, and The Palisades, as well as the area west of 142 St NW and north of 137 Ave NW to the border with St. Albert.

History

Boundary History
The district was created as Edmonton North West in the 1959 redistribution which broke up the mega-ridings of Edmonton and Calgary, creating a number of single-member districts in their place. It was replaced with Edmonton-Calder in 1971, but re-created from the same riding in 2017 when the Electoral Boundaries Commission recommended moving the Calder neighbourhood (among others) out of the riding. The district also gained three neighbourhoods from Edmonton-Castle Downs.

Representation history

The district was represented from 1959 to 1971 by Edgar Gerhart of the Alberta Social Credit Party, who had already served as one of several MLAs for Edmonton before it was split. He served as Minister of Municipal Affairs under premier Ernest Manning for his final term, and briefly as Attorney General as well under Harry Strom. Gerhart was defeated in Edmonton-Calder in the 1971 election.

Electoral results

Elections in the 1950s

Elections in the 1960s

Elections in the 2010s

References

Alberta provincial electoral districts
Politics of Edmonton